Stepan Fyodorovich Apraksin (- ), a relative of Fyodor M. Apraksin, commanded the Russian armies during the Seven Years' War. He should not be confused with his son Stepan Stepanovich Apraksin, who had a notable military career in the service of Catherine the Great.

Early life
Apraksin the Elder fought under Münnich against the Turks and rose rapidly to the rank of General. He was present at the taking of Ochakov in 1737 and brought to the Russian capital news about the capture of Khotin in 1739. Several years later, he led a Russian embassy to Persia.

Politics
At the Russian court Apraksin became one of the keenest opponents of both the pro-Prussian party and of Count Lestocq. He was one of the few devoted supporters of Chancellor Aleksey Bestuzhev, who ensured Apraksin's promotion to Field Marshal and appointment to command the Russian army on the outbreak of the Seven Years' War in 1756.

Seven Years' War
The next year Apraksin took up the overall command of the army invading Prussia and won the Battle of Gross-Jägersdorf on 30 August 1757, albeit with heavy losses. The Russian court, upon receiving news of the victory, expected Apraksin to overrun all of Prussia. Instead, on hearing that Empress Elizabeth had suffered a severe relapse in health, Apraksin crossed the Neman River and returned to Russia, intending to support the heir to the throne (the future Peter III of Russia, who represented the interests of Frederick II of Prussia) in the event of the Empress's death. According to another interpretation, he was recalled by Bestuzhev whose enemies plotted his downfall.

Downfall
As Elizabeth recovered, Bestuzhev fell from power and suffered banishment, and Apraksin came under the suspicion of having received bribes from the Prussian king. Put on trial, he died in prison under mysterious circumstances in August 1758 before the military tribunal had reached a decision as to the reasons for his scandalous retreat. He was replaced as commander in Prussia, by William Fermor who went on to fight the inconclusive Battle of Zorndorf against Frederick the Great.

Footnotes

References
Meyers Konversations-Lexikon
Biographies of the Russian Field Marshals (4 volumes), Saint Petersburg, 1840–1841

1702 births
1758 deaths
Russian nobility
Field marshals of Russia
Russian military personnel of the Seven Years' War
Russian people who died in prison custody
Prisoners who died in Russian detention
Diplomats of the Russian Empire
People of the Silesian Wars
Burials at Lazarevskoe Cemetery (Saint Petersburg)
Recipients of the Order of the White Eagle (Poland)